This is a list of people from Harlem in New York City.

The early period (pre-1920) 
 John James Audubon – naturalist
 Richard Croker – Tammany Hall politician, lived at 26 Mount Morris Park West
 James Reese Europe – musician, credited with inventing jazz; 67 West 133rd Street
 Thomas Gilroy – New York mayor
 Alexander Hamilton – politician; lived in Harlem at the end of his life
 Hubert Harrison – "The Father of Harlem Radicalism"
 Scott Joplin – pianist and composer; lived at 133 West 138th Street in 1916, then at 163 West 131st Street until his death in 1917; had a studio at 160 West 133rd Street
 Alfred Henry Lewis – cowboy author
 Vincent James McMahon – founder of the World Wide Wrestling Federation
 Paul Meltsner – WPA era painter and muralist; grew up in Harlem
 Thomas Nast – artist
 Philip A. Payton Jr. – real estate entrepreneur; lived at 13 West 131st Street
 Norman Rockwell – lived as a child at 789 St. Nicholas Avenue
 Norman Thomas – radical activist
 Daniel Tiemann – New York mayor
 Robert Van Wyck – New York mayor
 Cornelius Van Wyck Lawrence – New York mayor

Jewish, Italian, Irish Harlem (circa 1900–30) 

 Sholem Aleichem – writer, 110 Lenox Avenue
 Moe Berg (1902–1972) – Major League Baseball catcher; spy
 Milton Berle – comedian and actor, born in a five-story walkup at 68 West 118th Street
 Fanny Brice – actress, houses at West 128th Street and West 118th Street
 Art Buchwald – writer
 Bennett Cerf – publisher, was born on May 25, 1898, at 68 West 118th Street, the same address as Milton Berle's
 Morris Raphael Cohen – philosopher, 498 West 135th Street
 Milt Gabler – record producer, responsible for many innovations in the recording industry of the 20th century
 George and Ira Gershwin - composers, grew up in Harlem; lived at 108 West 111th and other addresses. George wrote his first hit song, "Swanee", at his home at 520 W. 144 Street in 1919. The pair were living at 501 Cathedral Parkway in 1924, and it was in this apartment that George wrote "Rhapsody in Blue."
 Oscar Hammerstein I – inventor and theatrical entrepreneur; lived at 333 Edgecombe Avenue
 Oscar Hammerstein II – writer and theatrical producer, addresses on East 116th Street and 112th Street
 Lorenz Hart – lyricist half of the Broadway songwriting team Rodgers and Hart, 59 West 119th Street
 Harry Houdini – magician; lived at 278 West 113th Street from 1904 until his death in 1926
 Frank Hussey – Olympian, 129th Street
 Burt Lancaster – Oscar-winning actor and producer
 Seymour Martin Lipset – political sociologist, senior fellow at the Hoover Institution at Stanford University, and Hazel Professor of Public Policy at George Mason University
 Ignazio Lupo – counterfeiter, gangster
 Marx Brothers – comedians, 239 East 114th Street
 Arthur Miller – playwright, 45 West 110th Street
 Giuseppe Morello – gangster, 323 East 107th Street
 Belle Moskowitz – political advisor to New York Governor and 1928 presidential candidate Al Smith
 Al Pacino – Academy Award-winning actor
 Charlie Pilkington – three-time New York champion boxer; East 102nd Street
 Ed Sullivan – Broadway & Sports columnist, host of the long-running televised Sunday evening variety show; East 114th Street
 David Rappaport – fashion manufacturer, designer and painter
 Richard Rodgers – composer, 3 West 120th Street
 Yossele Rosenblatt – celebrated cantor
 Henry Roth – writer, 108 East 119th Street
 Jessie Sampter – poet
 John Sanford, born Julian Lawrence Shapiro – screenwriter and author who wrote 24 books
 Arthur Sulzberger – publisher of the New York Times
 Henrietta Szold – founder of Hadassah
 Vincent and Ciro Terranova – gangsters, 352 East 116th Street

The Harlem Renaissance and World War II (1920–1945) 

 Louis Armstrong – bandleader and trumpet player
 Count Basie – bandleader and pianist; lived at 555 Edgecombe Avenue
 George Wilson Becton – religious cult leader
 Julius Bledsoe – singer; lived at 409 Edgecombe Avenue
 Arna Bontemps – writer
 William Stanley Braithwaite – poet and essayist; lived at 409 Edgecombe Avenue
 Eunice Carter – New York state judge; lived at 409 Edgecombe Avenue
 John Henrik Clarke – editor of Freedomways Magazine and of several books; professor; moved to Harlem in 1933
 Collyer brothers – compulsive hoarders; lived in a townhouse at 128th Street and Fifth Avenue in Harlem their entire adult lives
 Countee Cullen – poet
 Lillian Harris Dean – entrepreneur known as "Pigfoot Mary"
 Aaron Douglas – painter; lived at 409 Edgecombe Avenue
 W. E. B. Du Bois – activist, writer; lived at 409 Edgecombe
 Duke Ellington – composer, pianist and bandleader; lived on Riverside Drive and at 555 Edgecombe
 Father Divine – religious leader, lived in several locations in Harlem, including on Astor Row, and maintained offices at 20 West 115th Street
 Rudolph Fisher – writer
 Marcus Garvey – political figure, Pan-Africanist; home at 235 West 131st Street
 Billy Higgins (1888–1937), stage comedian, songwriter, and singer
 Charles Manuel "Sweet Daddy" Grace – evangelist, born in Cape Verde Islands but became prominent in Harlem in the 1920s
 Lionel Hampton – jazz musician; lived in Harlem through World War II and for some years thereafter
 Hubert Harrison – "the father of Harlem Radicalism"
 Leonard Harper – Harlem Renaissance producer, stager, and choreographer
 Coleman Hawkins – musician, saxophone player; lived at 555 Edgecombe Avenue
 Billie Holiday – singer; lived with her mother at 108 West 139th Street
 Casper Holstein – gangster
 Lena Horne – singer and actress; lived at 555 Edgecombe Avenue
 Langston Hughes – writer
 Zora Neale Hurston – writer
 Bumpy Johnson – gangster; lived in Lenox Terrace at 132nd Street and Lenox Avenue near the end of his life
 James P. Johnson – pianist
 James Weldon Johnson – author, activist, composer; lived at 187 West 135th Street
 Donald Jones – actor and dancer born in Harlem but moved to the Netherlands
 Fiorello La Guardia – New York mayor, from East Harlem
 Alain Locke – editor
 Joe Louis – boxer; lived at 555 Edgecombe Avenue
 Claude McKay – poet and novelist; born in Jamaica but moved to Harlem and wrote the famous novel Home to Harlem, West 131st Street
 Florence Mills – entertainer
 Adam Clayton Powell Sr. – religious, civic leader
 A. Philip Randolph – activist, labor organizer
 Paul Robeson – singer and actor; lived at 555 Edgecombe Avenue
 Bill "Bojangles" Robinson – dancer; lived on Strivers' Row
 James Herman Robinson – pastor of the Church of the Master on 122nd Street, founder of Operation Crossroads Africa, a forerunner of the Peace Corps
 Stephanie St. Clair – criminal leader; lived at 409 Edgecombe Avenue
 Willie "The Lion" Smith – pianist
 Wallace Thurman – writer
 Jean Toomer – writer
 James Van Der Zee – photographer
 Madam C.J. Walker – philanthropist and tycoon
 A'Lelia Walker – socialite and businesswoman
 Fats Waller – pianist, born at 107 West 134th Street
 Ethel Waters – singer, actress; born in Chester, Pennsylvania
 Margot Webb - professional dancer
 Walter Francis White – civil rights leader
 Bert Williams – vaudeville performer; born in Antigua; died in 1922, near the start of the Harlem Renaissance
 Mary Lou Williams – pianist; lived at 63 Hamilton Terrace
 Lillian "Billie" Yarbo – comedienne, dancer, singer

Famous after World War II 
 Miles Aiken – basketball player
 Fiona Apple – singer-songwriter and pianist, raised in Morningside Gardens
 James Baldwin – novelist; lived at 131st Street and Adam Clayton Powell Blvd. (then called "Seventh Avenue")
 Amiri Baraka, born LeRoi Jones – dancer, poet, activist
 Patricia Bath, ophthalmologist, inventor, humanitarian, and academic
 Romare Bearden – artist, primarily working in collage
 Harry Belafonte – calypso musician
 Claude Brown – novelist, wrote Manchild in the Promised Land
 Ron Brown – U.S. Secretary of Commerce, grew up in the Hotel Theresa
 Kareem Campbell – pro skateboarder
 George Carlin – comedian; 121st Street between Amsterdam and Broadway
 Jimmy Castor – R&B/funk bandleader
 Dr. Kenneth Clark – psychologist and activist; lived at 555 Edgecombe Avenue
 Evelyn Cunningham – civil-rights-era journalist and aide to Gov. Nelson A. Rockefeller of New York
 Jules Dassin – film director
 Benjamin J. Davis – New York City councilman, ultimately sent to jail for violations of the Smith Act
 Ossie Davis – actor and director; lived in Harlem in the late 1930s and mid-1940s
 Sammy Davis Jr. – entertainer, actor, member of Rat Pack, born in Harlem Hospital in 1925
 Roy DeCarava – photographer, born in Harlem in 1919
 Wanda De Jesus –  actress
 David Dinkins – Mayor of New York; lived in the Riverton Houses
 Ralph Ellison – novelist, wrote Invisible Man, about a man who moves from the deep south to Harlem; lived at 730 Riverside Drive in Harlem
 Erik Estrada – actor, from East Harlem
 Donald Faison – actor
 Jack Geiger – physician, co-founder of Physicians for Social Responsibility; lived with Canada Lee for a year at 555 Edgecombe Avenue
 Herbert Gentry – abstract expressionist painter, lived at 126th street and Amsterdam Avenue, 1940s
 Althea Gibson – professional tennis player; lived at 115 West 143rd Street
 Oscar Hammerstein II – writer and theatrical producer
 W. C. Handy – composer and bandleader; lived on Strivers' Row in Harlem towards the end of his life
 Benny Harris – musician, trumpet
 Lorenz Hart – lyricist
 Johnny Hartman – vocalist; born in Louisiana, grew up in Chicago, moved to Harlem's Sugar Hill in 1950s
 Evan Hunter, aka Ed McBain – author, grew up in East Harlem
 Roy Innis – head of the Congress of Racial Equality; lived in Harlem but ultimately moved to Brooklyn
 June Jordan – Caribbean American poet, novelist, journalist, biographer, dramatist, teacher
 JTG – WWE wrestler
 Ben E. King – soul singer and former lead tenor of The Drifters, best known for the song, "Stand By Me"
 Canada Lee – actor; lived at 555 Edgecombe Avenue
 Frank Lucas – drug dealer
 Frankie Lymon – lead tenor of The Teenagers, best known for the song "Why Do Fools Fall in Love?"
 Malcolm X – preacher, revolutionary
 Earl Manigault – basketball player
 Thurgood Marshall – Supreme Court justice; lived at 409 Edgecombe Avenue
 Carl McCall – New York State senator, and Comptroller of New York State
 Jackie McLean – musician, alto saxophone* Arthur Miller – playwright, was married to Marilyn Monroe 
 Hal Miller – actor (Sesame Street, Law & Order, etc.); also painter, singer, poet, lyricist, lived at 152nd Street & Macombs Place in the 1950s, born in Harlem
 Moby – musician, born in Harlem
 Edward Mosberg (1926-2022) - Polish-American Holocaust survivor, educator, and philanthropist
 Alice Neel – artist; lived in East Harlem
 Eleanor Holmes Norton – head of the Commission of Human Rights for New York City, now non-voting Delegate from the District of Columbia to the United States House of Representatives
 Elaine Parker – community organizer and activist, Chairperson of Harlem C.O.R.E. Director of the Manhattan Borough President's Office, Special Assistant to the City Council President City of NY
 Gordon Parks – film director and photographer
 Basil Paterson – New York state senator, New York City deputy mayor for labor relations, Vice-Chairman of the Democratic National Committee
 Fannie Pennington Harlem Civil Rights Foot Soldier 
 Samuel Pierce – Ronald Reagan's Secretary of Housing and Urban Development; lived in the Riverton Houses
 Adam Clayton Powell Jr. – politician
 Bud Powell – musician, pianist
 Tito Puente, Sr. – musician, Spanish Harlem
 Gene Anthony Ray – dancer and actor
 Ving Rhames  – actor
 Brandon 'Scoop B' Robinson, NBA analyst
 Sugar Ray Robinson – boxer, entrepreneur; moved to Harlem at age 12
 Sonny Rollins – musician, tenor saxophone
 Steve Rossi – comedian, former manager for Howard Stern
 Henry Roth – novelist
 J. D. Salinger – novelist; lived at 3681 Broadway until he was nine years old
 Hazel Scott – pianist, wife of Adam Clayton Powell, Jr., first African-American woman with her own television show
 Nina Simone – singer; lived, for a time, in Duke Ellington's old house in Harlem
 Thomas Sowell – professional economist and author
 Billy Strayhorn – jazz composer, arranger
 Percy Sutton – Borough President of Manhattan: "If I were offered a million dollars, I wouldn't leave Harlem."
 Billy Taylor – jazz pianist; lived in the Riverton Houses
 Clarice Taylor – actress on the Cosby Show
Conrad Tillard (born 1964) - politician, Baptist minister, radio host, author, and civil rights activist
 Samuel E Vázquez – abstract expressionist painter
 Dinah Washington – "Queen of the Blues"; born in Alabama but became famous when she lived in Harlem
 Roy Wilkins – civil rights leader; lived at 409 Edgecombe
 Louis T. Wright – physician, chairman of the board of the NAACP
 Morrie Yohai – rabbi, inventor of Cheez Doodles

Rap, hip hop, R&B and reality 
 40 Cal – rapper
 ASAP Ferg – rapper ASAP Mob
 ASAP Rocky – rapper from Harlem (member of ASAP Mob)
 Azealia Banks – rapper, singer, lyricist
 Big L – rapper 
 Black Rob – rapper from Spanish Harlem
 Cam'ron – rapper (owner of Diplomat Records) (Dipset)
 Cannibal Ox – rap duo
 Crash Crew – old-school rap group
 Yaya DaCosta – America's Next Top Model contestant/model
 Damon Dash – Co-founder of Roc-A-Fella Records
 DJ Hollywood – VH-1 hip hop honoree; rap/hip-hop pioneer
 DJ Red Alert – DJ, hip hop pioneer
 Kool Moe Dee – old-school rapper and one-third of the Treacherous Three
 Rob Base and DJ E-Z Rock – rap duo best known for their hit "It Takes Two"
 Dave East – rapper (Mass Appeal Records)
 Famous Dex – rapper
 Fatman Scoop – Grammy and MTV Award winner; radio personality; reality TV star
 The Fearless Four – pioneer rap group
 Doug E. Fresh – '80s rapper, runs a waffle house in Harlem
 Spoonie Gee – pioneer rapper
 Ebony Haith – America's Next Top Model contestant, model
 Charles Hamilton – rapper
 Ilacoin – hip hop artist, creator of the "Pause" game
 Freddie Jackson – singer
 Jim Jones – rapper (co-CEO of Diplomat Records) (Dipset)
 Joe Budden – rapper, media personality, host of The Joe Budden Podcast 
 Kareem "Biggs" Burke - co-founder of Roc-A-Fella Records
 Kelis – R&B singer and songwriter
 Rayne Storm – rapper, producer (Digiindie)
 Puff Daddy – rapper, businessman, founder of Bad Boy Records
 Freekey Zekey – rapper (owner, CEO of 730 Dips Records)
 Immortal Technique – rapper
 Kurtis Blow – rapper
 Lil Mama – rapper; judge of America's Best Dance Crew
 Biz Markie – rapper, disc jockey owns a Waffle House
 Mase – rapper 
 Jae Millz – rapper
 P-Star – rapper, singer, actress
 Q-Tip – rapper, producer (A Tribe Called Quest)
 Teddy Riley – producer, artist
 Tupac Shakur - rapper
 Carl Hancock Rux – writer, performer
 Isabel Sanford – actor; co-star of The Jeffersons
 Juelz Santana – rapper (owner, CEO of Skull Gang Records)
 Bre Scullark – America's Next Top Model contestant, model
 Smoke DZA – rapper
 Dani Stevenson – singer
 Keith Sweat – singer
 Teyana Taylor – singer and rapper signed to Kanye West's G.O.O.D. Music label
 Treacherous Three – old-school rap group
 T-Rex – battle rapper (member Of Dot Mob)
 Vado – rapper (We The Best Records)
 Billy Dee Williams – actor
 JR Writer – rapper (Dipset member)
 Bodega Bamz - rapper, actor
 Sheck Wes - rapper

21st-century residents 
 Bob Dylan - owned a brownstone on Striver’s Row from 1980’s until year 2000. The townhouse is located at  265 West 139th Street and it sold in 2018 for $3.7M
Kareem Abdul-Jabbar – basketball player, moved into a Mount Morris brownstone at 30 West 120th Street in September 2006
 Lorraine Adams – writer and journalist
 Maya Angelou – poet and author, owned a home on 120th Street in Mount Morris Park district
 Angela Bassett – Emmy and Academy Award-nominated, and Golden Globe-winning actress
 Keith David – actor and singer 
 Charlotte d'Amboise – actress and dancer
 Jonathan Franzen – author; lived on 125th Street when he wrote his book The Corrections
 Daphne Frias – activist
 Marcia Gay Harden – Oscar-winning actress
 Edward W. Hardy – Composer, musician and producer
 Neil Patrick Harris – actor; lives near Morningside Park when not in Los Angeles
 Rashidah Ismaili, writer
 Jeff L. Lieberman – film director
 Terrance Mann – actor and dancer
 Cameron Mathison – actor on All My Children and contestant on Dancing with the Stars, 136 West 130th Street
 S. Epatha Merkerson – actress
 Harold "Hal" Miller – actor ("Gordon" on Sesame Street), lived on 152nd Street & Macombs Place, before going to live and work in China, India and throughout Europe
 Mandy Patinkin – actor
 Adam Clayton Powell IV – New York City Council member
 Richard Price – author and screenwriter
 Marcus Samuelsson – chef and restaurateur; lived in duplex near Frederick Douglass Boulevard
 Miz Cracker - Drag Queen
 Akhnaten Spencer-El – Olympic fencer
 Stephen Spinella – Tony Award-winning actor
 Joel Steinberg – killed his adopted daughter; moved to Harlem after his 2004 release from prison
 Alton White – hockey player
 Khalid Yasin – born in Harlem; raised in Brooklyn; teacher and lecturer of Islam
 Oscar Peñas – composer and jazz guitarist – born in Barcelona, Spain; moved from Clinton Hill, Brooklyn to Hamilton Height, Harlem in 2018
 Alysia Reiner -  American actress and producer. Reiner is best known for playing Natalie "Fig" Figueroa in the Netflix comedy drama series Orange Is the New Black (2013–2019), for which she won a Screen Actors Guild Award for her role as part of the ensemble cast.

Representatives
 Inez Dickens - New York City Council
 Robert Jackson – New York City council
 David Paterson – New York State Governor
 Bill Perkins – New York State Senator
 Adam Clayton Powell IV – New York State Assembly
 Charles B. Rangel – United States House of Representatives, lives in Lenox Terrace at 132nd Street and Lenox Avenue
 José M. Serrano – New York State Senate
 Keith L.T. Wright – New York State Assembly

References 

Harlem
People

Harlem